The Republic of Equatorial Guinea is located in west central Africa. The larger continental region of Río Muni lies between Cameroon and Gabon on the mainland; it includes the islands of Corisco, Elobey Grande, Elobey Chico, and adjacent islets.

Bioko Island, called Fernando Po until the 1970s, is the largest island in the Gulf of Guinea - . It is shaped like a boot, with two large volcanic formations separated by a valley that bisects the island at its narrowest point. The  coastline is steep and rugged in the south but lower and more accessible in the north, with excellent harbors at Malabo and Luba, and several scenic beaches between those towns.

The coastal plain gives way to a succession of valleys separated by low hills and spurs of the Crystal Mountains. The Rio Benito (Mbini) which divides Río Muni in half, is unnavigable except for a 20-kilometer stretch at its estuary. Temperatures and humidity in Río Muni are generally lower than on Bioko Island.

Annobon Island, named for its discovery on New Year's Day 1472, is a small volcanic island covering . The coastline is abrupt except in the north; the principal volcanic cone contains a small lake. Most of the estimated 1,900 inhabitants are fisherman specializing in traditional, smallscale tuna fishing and whaling. The climate is tropical—heavy rainfall, high humidity, and frequent seasonal changes with violent windstorms.

Location:
Central Africa, bordering the Bight of Biafra, between Cameroon and Gabon.

Boundaries 
Equatorial Guinea's land boundaries total 539 km. It borders Cameroon (189 km) in the north and Gabon (350 km) in the east and south.

Maritime claims:
territorial sea:

Exclusive economic zone:
 with

Climate 

The climate of both the continental region and the islands is typically equatorial, with high temperatures, heavy rainfall, and much cloud cover most of the year. Local variations are due to differences in altitude and proximity to the sea. The wet seasons in the continental region are from February to June and from September to December. Rainfall is higher on the coast than inland. In Bata the rainiest months are September, October, and November, with rainfall averaging more than  a year. At Calatrava, farther south on the coast, it sometimes reaches . The temperature maxima are somewhat lower than in Bioko. The relative humidity, however, is higher than in Bioko. Bioko has a rather debilitating climate. The so-called dry season lasts from November to March, and the rest of the year is rainy. The average annual temperature of about  varies little throughout the year. Most of the time the sky is cloudy and overcast. Extreme rainfall occurs in the south, with rain brought by monsoon winds amounting to about  a year around San Antonio de Ureca.

Terrain 

Coastal plains rise to interior hills; islands are volcanic.

Total renewable water resources:
26 km3 (2011)

Natural hazards:
violent windstorms, flash floods

Environment - current issues:
tap water is not potable; deforestation

Environment - international agreements:
party to:
Biodiversity, Desertification, Endangered Species, Hazardous Wastes, Law of the Sea, Marine Dumping, Ozone Layer Protection, Ship Pollution, Wetlands

Geography - note:
insular and continental regions rather widely separated

Extreme points 

This is a list of the extreme points of Equatorial Guinea, the points that are farther north, south, east or west than any other location.

 Northernmost point - Punta Europa, Bioko Island
 Easternmost point - the entire length of the eastern border with Gabon, which runs in a straight line
 Southernmost point - A Dyibó, Annobón Island
 Westernmost point - Punta Dyiscoj, Annobón Island

See also
Equatorial Guinea

References